The following is a list of films produced in the Kannada film industry in India in 2001, presented in alphabetical order.

List of released films

References

 2001 Year Round Up

External links
 Kannada Movies of 2001 at the Internet Movie Database

2001
Kannada
 
2001 in Indian cinema